Winterbourne Chalk Pit is a  geological Site of Special Scientific Interest west of Winterbourne in Berkshire. It is a Geological Conservation Review site. It is located within the North Wessex Downs.

The chalk sediments date to the late Cretaceous period, about 80 million years ago. The pit is the only known area containing rocks of this age in the western part of the London Basin. It is rich in macrofossils, particularly belemnites.  The site is private land with no public access.

References

Sites of Special Scientific Interest in Berkshire
Geological Conservation Review sites
Chalk pits